Li Xiang or Xiang Li may refer to:

Li Auto, or Li Xiang a Chinese electric automobile manufacturer

People with the surname Li
Li Xiangjun (1624–1654), or Li Xiang, Ming dynasty courtesan
Li Xiang (born 1967), Chinese electronic information expert, major general, member of the Chinese Academy of Sciences.
Li Xiang (host) (born 1976), Chinese actress, host and singer
Xiang Li (hacker) (born 1977), Chinese software pirate
Li Xiang (journalist) (1981–2011), Chinese TV journalist who was killed after reporting corruption

Sportspeople
Li Xiang (footballer, born 1989), Chinese football player 
Li Xiang (footballer, born 1991), Chinese football player 
Li Xiang (swimmer) (born 1993), Chinese swimmer

People with the surname Xiang
Xiang Li (activist) (born 1976), activist for human rights causes in China

See also
Lixiang (disambiguation)
Xiangli (disambiguation)